Shuangmiao Township is a township of Pingyu County in southeastern Henan province, China, located about  southeast of the county seat. , it has 7 villages under its administration.

See also 
 List of township-level divisions of Henan

References 

Township-level divisions of Henan